Robert T. Hamilton (January 10, 1916 – December 6, 1990) was an American professional golfer. He was born, raised, and died in Evansville, Indiana.  He attended and graduated from Evansville Reitz High School in 1934.

Hamilton won ten professional titles, including one major, the PGA Championship in 1944 at Manito Golf and Country Club in Spokane, Washington. Then a match play event, he defeated heavily favored Byron Nelson in the finals, 1 up. Hamilton was a three-time winner of the Indiana Open, winning in 1938, 1942, and 1966. He won five times on the PGA Tour, including the 1948 New Orleans Open, one stroke ahead of runner-up  Roberto De Vicenzo. Hamilton was also a member of the 1949 Ryder Cup team.

Hamilton also served as the golf pro at Fort Lewis, south of Seattle, during the latter stages of World War II; he was also a member of the Warriors, the inter-base (intramural) team.  Individually, he placed 3rd in the Pacific Northwest Servicemen's Championship (Seattle) and 3rd in the Tacoma Open, a PGA Tour event.

Hamilton finished second to Sam Snead in the 1967 Senior PGA Championship at PGA National Golf Club in Palm Beach Gardens, Florida.

Hamilton set the overall record for youngest golfer to shoot his age when he shot a 59 at Hamilton Golf Club in Evansville in 1975.

Hamilton was inducted into the Indiana Golf Hall of Fame in 1965, as a member of the 2nd class so honored.

Amateur wins (2)
This list may be incomplete
1934 IHSAA Boys State Champion 
1936 Indiana Amateur

Professional wins (10)

PGA Tour wins (5)

PGA Tour playoff record (0–1)

Other wins (5)
This list may be incomplete
1938 Indiana Open
1942 Indiana Open
1943 Indiana PGA Championship
1944 Indiana PGA Championship
1966 Indiana Open

Major championships

Wins (1)

Note: The PGA Championship was match play until 1958

Results timeline

Note: Hamilton never played in The Open Championship.

NT = no tournament
WD = withdrew
CUT = missed the half-way cut
R64, R32, R16, QF, SF = round in which player lost in PGA Championship match play
"T" indicates a tie for a place

Summary

Most consecutive cuts made – 11 (1941 U.S. Open – 1949 Masters)
Longest streak of top-10s – 2 (1952 PGA – 1953 Masters)

See also
Chronological list of men's major golf champions
List of men's major championships winning golfers

References

External links
Indiana Golf Hall of Fame
Funeral home card from Browning Genealogy database

American male golfers
PGA Tour golfers
Ryder Cup competitors for the United States
Winners of men's major golf championships
Golfers from Indiana
Sportspeople from Evansville, Indiana
1916 births
1990 deaths